The 1985–86 Yugoslav Cup was the 38th season of the top football knockout competition in SFR Yugoslavia, the Yugoslav Cup, also known as the "Marshal Tito Cup" (Kup Maršala Tita), since its establishment in 1946. It was won by Velež.

Calendar

First round
In the following tables winning teams are marked in bold; teams from outside top level are marked in italic script.

Second round

Quarter-finals

Semi-finals

Final

See also
1985–86 Yugoslav First League
1985–86 Yugoslav Second League

External links
1985–86 cup season details at Rec.Sport.Soccer Statistics Foundation
1986 cup final details at Rec.Sport.Soccer Statistics Foundation

Yugoslav Cup seasons
Cup
Yugo